Filian-e Qaem Maqam (also Romanized as Fīlīān-e Qā’em Maqām and Felīān-e Qa’em Maqām; also known as Felīān-e Qa’em Maqāmī and Qa’em Maqām-e ‘Olyā) is a village in Miyan Velayat Rural District, in the Central District of Mashhad County, Razavi Khorasan Province, Iran. At the 2006 census, its population was 98, in 19 families.

References 

Populated places in Mashhad County